Léon Courtejaire (1 March 1901 – 30 January 1973) was a French athlete. He competed in the men's pentathlon at the 1924 Summer Olympics.

References

External links
 

1901 births
1973 deaths
Athletes (track and field) at the 1924 Summer Olympics
French pentathletes
Olympic athletes of France
Place of birth missing